George Vidalis is an Australian actor who has appeared in many television series and films. George is best known for his role as Manolis in the comedy series Acropolis Now.

George has appeared in such television series as Blue Heelers, Underbelly, Stingers, A Country Practice, Big Sky, Prisoner and The Flying Doctors. His film roles include Macbeth, The Night We Called It a Day and The Heartbreak Kid.

References

External links

Living people
Australian male film actors
Australian male television actors
Australian people of Greek descent
Year of birth missing (living people)